Siegfried Freytag (10 November 1919 – 2 June 2003) was a World War II German Luftwaffe pilot and wing commander. As a fighter ace, he was credited with 102 aerial victories of which 49 victories were claimed over the Eastern Front. Among his victories over the Western Front are at least 2 four-engine bombers. He was a recipient of the Knight's Cross of the Iron Cross Freytag had been nominated for the Knight's Cross of the Iron Cross with Oak Leaves, but the war ended before the paperwork had been processed.

Freytag was born on 10 November 1919 and joined the Luftwaffe in 1938. After completing training as a fighter pilot he was posted to 6. Staffel (squadron) Jagdgeschwader 77 (JG 77—Fighter Wing 77) in the autumn, 1940. Freytag claimed his first victory on 31 October 1940 on the final day of the Battle of Britain. In April 1941 he participated in the Balkans Campaign, the Battle of Greece and Battle of Crete. In June Freytag was deployed to the Eastern Front with JG 77 for Operation Barbarossa, the invasion of the Soviet Union. Freytag passed five victories becoming a flying ace and by 3 June 1942 he had claimed 50 enemy aircraft destroyed.

On 27 June 1942, Freytag was appointed Staffelkapitän (Squadron leader) of 1. Staffel and relocated to the Mediterranean Theatre. Freytag participated in the air battle over Malta. On 3 July 1942 Freytag was awarded the Knight's Cross of the Iron Cross for 53 aerial victories. He became the most successful German pilot over Malta. Freytag was transferred with his unit to North Africa to assist the collapsing Axis forces. On 13 March 1943, Freytag was appointed Gruppenkommandeur (Group Commander) of II./JG 77. By this date he had claimed 85 victories. Freytag continued operations over Sicily where he was shot down and wounded in action on 12 July 1943.

Thereafter, Freytag led the group in Defence of the Reich operations. On 13 June 1944 Freytag scored his 100th victory. In December 1944 Freytag commanded JG 77 in air superiority operations on the Western Front at the beginning Ardennes Offensive until 25 December 1944 when he was appointed Geschwaderkommodore (Wing Commander) on a temporary basis. Freytag scored his 102nd and last aerial victory during Operation Bodenplatte, on 1 January 1945. In April 1945 Freytag served with Jagdgeschwader 51 (JG 51—Fighter Wing 51) and Jagdgeschwader 7 (JG 7—Fighter Wing 7), where he flew the Messerschmitt Me 262 until the German surrender in May 1945.

After war he served in the French Foreign Legion. Freytag died in France in 2003.

Early life
Freytag was born on 10 November 1919 in Danzig-Langfuhr, at the time in the Province of West Prussia. Today Danzig-Langfuhr is Wrzeszcz, a borough of the Polish city of Gdańsk. Following flight training, he was posted to the 6. Staffel (6th squadron) of Jagdgeschwader 77 (JG 77—77th Fighter Wing).

World War II
World War II in Europe had begun on Friday 1 September 1939 when German forces invaded Poland. Freytag began wartime operations in October 1940. On 31 October—considered by the British to be the final day of the Battle of Britain—on patrol west of Lister, Norway, at 16:00 CET, he shot down a RAF Coastal Command Lockheed Hudson, T9377 from No. 233 Squadron RAF. Pilot Officer W.O. Weaber, B. P. Erskine Sergeant J. A. Wallace and H. Dean were killed in action, buried Sola Church and commemorated at the Runnymede Memorial. During the Battle of Greece, on 24 April 1941, Freytag crashed his Bf 109E near Athens following combat and was wounded.

Eastern Front
In early June I. and III./JG 77 were deployed to Romania and subordinated to IV. Fliegerkorps under the command of Kurt Pflugbeil. The battle group was designated as close air support to Army Group South. On 22 June 1941 the German Wehrmacht commenced Operation Barbarossa, the invasion of the Soviet Union. Freytag achieved steady success. He reported his 10th claim on 12 August 1941 and his 20th victory on 31 October 1941. This day he downed a Mikoyan-Gurevich MiG-3 in the morning during a combat air patrol to support German forces in the Battle of Rostov. Aleksandr Grosul and Ivan Voytenko of the 55 IAP were reported missing in action. On 23 March 1942, Freytag engaged and shot down a Yakovlev Yak-1. The Staffel engaged three Yak-1s from the 247 IAP this day, piloted by Major Mikhail Fedoseyev, the unit commander, Stepan Karnach, Vasiliy Shevchuk and Viktor Golovko. Fedoseyev was killed while Shevchuk was shot down and force-landed. One of the Yak fighters became Freytag's 26th victory. II./JG 77 also took a heavy toll of Soviet air forces in the Siege of Odessa, before Freytag's group was withdrawn to Kherson. In the autumn, 1941, JG 77 was heavily involved in operations over the Crimea. In December the Red Army made an amphibious assault on the eastern end of the region to disrupt the Siege of Sevastopol and re-establish airbases there. Throughout December 1941 and through to June 1942, north I. and II./JG 77 were involved in combat operations (III./JG 77 was removed because of losses). Kerch fell to the Axis on 20 May 1942. Freytag's II. Gruppe (2nd group) participated in the Sevastopol operation with III. Gruppe until mid-June.

Malta, North Africa and Sicily
On 27 June 1942, Freytag was appointed Staffelkapitän (squadron leader) of 1. Staffel and was transferred with this squadron to Sicily. From here, I./JG 77 was to escort German bomber formations attacking Malta and its sea communications. Freytag achieved a series of successes against Royal Air Force (RAF) fighters over the summer 1942 that he was nicknamed the Stern von Malta (The Star of Malta). On 3 July Freytag was awarded the Knight's Cross of the Iron Cross for 50 victories. On 27 July Freytag led eight Bf 109s in a battle against Supermarine Spitfires, but the German formation lost three—including Freytag who ditched into the Mediterranean Sea after being shot down. Freytag was rescued by a seaplane. On 6 July Freytag shot down American Flight Sergeant Edwin Moye of No. 185 Squadron RAF, who was killed. By 11 October 1942 Freytag had claimed 73 aircraft destroyed. On this date Freytag claimed a solitary Spitfire.

On 23 October 1942 1. Staffel was transferred to Egypt as the North African campaign entered its final phase. The British Army began the Second Battle of El Alamein and the Luftwaffe rushed in reinforcements. On 11 November 1942, near El Alamein, Freytag claimed two Spitfires. On 13 January Freytag may have shot down a Martin Baltimore. On 28 January he accounted for a B-26 Marauder. On 1 March 1943 Freytag was promoted to Hauptmann.

Group commander
On 7 March 1943 Freytag was appointed temporary Gruppenkommandeur (group commander) of II./JG 77 based at La Fauconnerie, Tunisia. He officially succeeded Major Anton Mader in this capacity who had been transferred on 1 April. In the afternoon of the 13 March Geschwaderkommodore (wing commander) Joachim Müncheberg led I./JG 77 over Gabes. On this sortie, Freytag claimed his 86th and 87th victories, after Müncheberg ordered them to attack some low-flying United States Army Air Force (USAAF) P-39 Airacobras.

On 30 March Freytag led the Gruppe against USAAF bombing raids. The Bf 109s engaged the US 52d Fighter Group, which was escorting 18 A-20 Havoc bombers against La Fauconnerie. Ernst-Wilhelm Reinert claimed two bombers before the P-40s claimed two German fighters. Freytag claimed one P-40 in this battle for his 88th victory. On 4 April JG 77 engaged in a day of heavy air combat with the new commanding officer Johannes Steinhoff and lost three pilots. Steinhoff and Reinert claimed three and one respectively. Their opponents were Spitfires and Curtiss P-40 Warhawks from the US 33rd Fighter Group. Freytag claimed a Spitfire on this day. On 5 April Operation Flax commenced as Allied air forces attacked German air transports. The Tunisian Campaign ended with the Axis capitulation on 13 May 1943. Freytag accounted for his last victory in this theatre on 7 May when he downed a Spitfire over Tunis—his 94th victory. JG 77 was the last German fighter unit to leave Africa.

II./JG 77 relocated to Sicily. There the formation was responsible for the air defence of the island. Freytag gained four victories over Sicily including two on 9 July. The same day Operation Husky began and Allied forces landed. Three days later Freytag was shot down and wounded in combat with Lockheed P-38 Lightning over Gela. Allied forces achieved air supremacy by 13 July and all except II./Jagdgeschwader 51 (JG 51—51st Fighter Wing) had been driven to the northeastern coast. Few fighters remained, but II./JG 77 abandoned Trapani and the remnants of the German fighter units retreated to Foggia in Italy. By the time JG 77 departed Sicily, it had claimed 27 Allied aircraft in combat from 10 to 31 July 1943 but lost 51 Bf 109s and 12 pilots killed. II./JG 77 remained on the Mediterranean Front. Freytag was wounded by an Allied air attack on the group's airfield at Siena, Italy on 29 January 1944. During his convalescence, he was temporarily replaced by Hauptmann Emil Omert as Gruppenkommandeur of II. Gruppe. Freytag returned to his command in April 1944.

The Gruppe participated in the Italian Campaign until its withdrawal the following summer. Freytag claimed his victories over Consolidated B-24 Liberators on 29 May and 13 June 1944. On the latter date the US 15th Air Force bombed targets in Sisak, Yugoslavia and Pétfürdő, Hungary using the 47th Bomb Wing and 55th Bomb Wing. The B-24 Freytag claimed was his 100th victory. According to Obermaier, he claimed his 100th aerial victory in December 1944 which would make him the 96th Luftwaffe pilot to achieve the century mark.

Defence of the Reich and Western Front
In the summer, II./JG 77 moved back to Germany for Defence of the Reich operations. This period was not successful for Freytag. One notable dogfight occurred on 27 September 1944. Feytag may have shot down Henry Wallace McLeod, who was also one of the most successful aces over Malta. Freytag claimed the only Spitfire on 27 September 1944 in the Duisburg area. James "Johnnie" Johnson had been in the same combat and saw McLeod chasing a Bf 109 and then lost sight of McLeod. Johnson concluded that the Bf 109 had shot down McLeod. His body was found in the wreckage of his Spitfire near Wesel, not far from Duisburg.

On 16 December the German High Command (Oberkommando der Wehrmacht) initiated Unternehmen Wacht am Rhein (Operation Watch on the Rhine), a land offensive through the Ardennes. The Luftwaffe supported the offensive. JG 77 suffered heavily in the air battles with the RAF Second Tactical Air Force and the US Ninth Air Force and Eighth Air Force. On 23 December 1944 I./JG 77 lost 15 fighters and six pilots killed in exchange for one P-47 Thunderbolt and a B-26 Marauder. In the afternoon, III./JG 77 were engaged by P-47s over Bad Münstereifel and lost 10 Bf 109s destroyed and three damaged along with two pilots killed and six wounded. Only three P-47s were claimed.

On Christmas Eve, JG 77 attempted an all-out effort to support the 5th Panzer Army and the 6th Panzer Army as their advance stalled. Freytag's I./JG 77 took off from Dortmund with 24 Bf 109s and flew a patrol in the  Luxembourg area. In large-scale air fighting, Major Johannes Wiese, Geschwaderkommodore of JG 77 was wounded in combat with Spitfires. I./JG 77 was decimated when it encountered P-47 and P-38s in the target area. 16 Bf 109s were shot down and 10 pilots killed, including experienced leader Lothar Baumann (2./JG 77). One pilot became a prisoner of war in exchange for a single P-38. The losses had a devastating effect on morale. Until Wiese's formal replacement arrived with the Geschwader, command was temporally passed on to Freytag. JG 77's ordeal was not over. On Christmas Day 1944, the Eighth Air Force sent 2,034 heavy bombers and 818 fighters to attack airfields and communication centres in the largest single-attack of the war. RAF Bomber Command sent 338 aircraft (248 Avro Lancaster, 248 Handley-Page Halifax and 11 de Havilland Mosquito bombers) to attack airfields at Düsseldorf-Lohausen and Essen-Mülheim. The airfields were home to III. and II./JG 77. The bases were severely damaged and forced the units to operate from grass airfields.

Acting wing commander and end of war
On 26 December, Freytag temporarily assumed command of JG 77 as Geschwaderkommodore. JG 77 tried to support the offensive in the last week of December. On 27 December, the Geschwader flew operations with all Gruppen but in small numbers. Three P-47s were claimed for the loss of three pilots and four Bf 109s. On 29 December the grass at Essen became to wet and II./JG 77 moved to Bönninghardt, a small grass field southwest of Wesel.  On 31 December Freytag organised III./JG 77s withdrawal to Dortmund. During the transfer, the remaining 12 Bf 109s of the Gruppe were engaged by Allied fighters and lost three Bf 109s and two pilots. Freytag's command had lost 31 dead or missing, 13 wounded and one captured. The fighter unit had lost 86 Bf 109s destroyed or damaged against 15 Allied aircraft claimed.

Freytag participated and led JG 77 in Operation Bodenplatte, the failed attempt to cripple Allied air forces in the Low Countries. The objective of Bodenplatte was to gain air superiority. Freytag was ordered to lead II./JG 77 in an attack on the airfield at Antwerp-Deurne. This airbase hosted RAF Hawker Typhoon wings that had dogged German forces from Normandy to Germany. On the morning of 1 January 1945 Freytag was ordered to lead both I. and III. He conducted the brief that morning. At 08:00, the two formations 18 Bf 109s of I. and III./JG 77 took off. At the same time 23 Bf 109s of II./JG 77 took off. Around the Bocholt area they formed up with the other two Gruppen. As the fighter wing headed north, it passed Woensdrecht airfield. The aerodrome was home to 132 Wing and its five Spitfire squadrons; 331, 332, 66 and 127, and 322 (Dutch). Some pilots from II./JG 77 either mistakenly believed it to be Antwerp, or thought the opportunity was too good to pass up. Two German fighters were claimed shot down, and one pilot captured. However, none of the JG 77 casualties fit this description.

The main body continued to Antwerp. Some 12–30 German fighters attacked the airfield from 09:25 to 09:40. The ground defences were alert and the German formations attacked in a disorganised manner. 145 Wing RAF was missed completely and considering the large number of targets the destruction was light; just 12 Spitfires were destroyed. In total, 14 Allied aircraft were destroyed and nine damaged. JG 77 lost 11 Bf 109s and their pilots were lost. Six were killed and five captured according to Allied sources. However, German records show the loss of only 10 pilots. Four are listed as captured. During the battle Freytag claimed his 102nd aerial victory over a Spitfire that day, his last aerial victory claimed. No details are known. JG 77's attack was failure.

On 15 January 1945, Freytag relinquished command of JG 77 to Major Erich Leie who had already officially been appointed Geschwaderkommodore on 29 December 1944. On 7 March 1945, Leie was killed in action when he collided with a crashing Russian Yakovlev Yak-9 fighter which he had just shot down. Freytag was subsequently again given the task of leading JG 77. Freytag returned to II. Gruppe on 1 April when command of JG 77 was given to Major Fritz Losigkeit. Freytag had left JG 77 in late April. He was scheduled to take over command of JG 51 but never took command of this unit. Instead, he traveled to Prague where he joined Jagdgeschwader 7 "Nowotny" (JG 7—7th Fighter Wing), flying the Messerschmitt Me 262 first operational jet fighter.

French Foreign Legion and death
Following World War 2, Freytag was without a job and without a family. One of his brothers was killed in 1944 on the Eastern Front, his sister and the rest of his family disappeared in the sinking of the MV Wilhelm Gustloff. The family assets having been confiscated by the post-war territorial divisions, he then worked as a miner and then as a technician.

In 1952, Freytag, volunteered in the Legion thinking that the Legion would recruit pilots; at least, that was the official version of a wrong assumption. Assigned to the 5th Foreign Infantry Regiment after his basic training at Sidi Bel Abbès, Legionnaire Siegfried served and fought with distinction for 18 years with the 13th Demi-Brigade of the Foreign Legion; the former Free French Demi-Brigade, in the Indochina War, the Algerian War and Djibouti. Promoted to Sergent in 1962, he asked to be demoted to the rank of Caporal Chef and served in the 1st Foreign Regiment from 1965 to 1970, the year in which he retired from active duty. Freytag died on 2 June 2003 in Marseille. He was interred in the Carré militaire of the Institution des invalides de la Légion étrangère in Puyloubier.

Summary of career

Aerial victory claims
According to US historian David T. Zabecki, Freytag was credited with 102 aerial victories. Spick lists Freytag with 102 aerial victories as well, of which approximately 70 were claimed over the Eastern Front and further 32 over the Western Front, North Africa and Meditarraenan theater, claimed in an unknown number of combat missions. Obermaier also lists him 102 aerial victories of which 49 were claimed over the Eastern Front. Mathews and Foreman, authors of Luftwaffe Aces — Biographies and Victory Claims, researched the German Federal Archives and state that Freytag was credited with 89 aerial victories, 44 on the Eastern Front and 45 on the Western Front, including three heavy bombers. In addition to these claims, according to Prien, Stemmer, Rodeike and Bock, Freytag further claimed eleven, potentially twelve, undocumented aerial victories.

Victory claims were logged to a map-reference (PQ = Planquadrat), for example "PQ 35391". These sectors were then subdivided into 36 smaller units to give a location area 3 × 4 km in size.

Awards
 Honour Goblet of the Luftwaffe (Ehrenpokal der Luftwaffe) on 18 May 1942 Oberleutnant and pilot
 Knight's Cross of the Iron Cross on 3 July 1942 as Oberleutnant and pilot in the I./Jagdgeschwader 77
 German Cross in Gold on 25 January 1943 as Oberleutnant  in the 1./Jagdgeschwader 77

Notes

References

Citations

Bibliography

 
 
 
 
 
 
 
 
 
 
 
 
 
 
 
 
 
 
 
 
 
 
 
 
 
 
 
 
 
 
 
 
 
 
 
 
 
 
 
 
 

1919 births
2003 deaths
Luftwaffe pilots
German World War II flying aces
Military personnel from Gdańsk
People from West Prussia
Recipients of the Gold German Cross
Recipients of the Knight's Cross of the Iron Cross
Soldiers of the French Foreign Legion
French military personnel of the First Indochina War
French military personnel of the Algerian War